Wyatt Agar (born October 2, 1981) is an American politician, rancher, partner, and deacon from Thermopolis, Wyoming who served in the Wyoming Senate from 2017 to 2021, representing the 20th legislative district of Wyoming as a Republican in the 64th and 65th Wyoming Legislatures.

Early life
Agar was born in Weiser, Idaho on October 2, 1981.

Career
Agar is a rancher and partner in the Durbin Creek Ranch outside of Thermopolis. He moved to Wyoming in 2009 for agricultural opportunities. 

Agar served as Vice Chairman and Secretary for the Hot Springs County Republican Party. Additionally, he serves as a deacon at the First Baptist Church of Thermopolis.

2016 election
When incumbent Republican senator Gerald Geis announced his retirement, Agar announced his candidacy for the seat.

Agar defeated Ron Harvey and Bob Bayuk in the Republican primary with 57% of the vote. He then defeated Democrat Mary Jane Norskog in the general election with 82% of the vote.

In 2017, Agar served on the following committees.
Corporations, Elections and Political Subdivisions
Transportation, Highways and Military Affairs
Joint Corporations, Elections and Political Subdivisions
Joint Transportation, Highways and Military Affairs
Between 2019 and 2020, Agar was assigned to the Joint Appropriations Committee and the Senate Appropriations Committee.

Agar's term began on January 10, 2017 and concluded on January 4, 2021. He did not run for re-election in 2020.

Political positions
During his 2016 campaign, Agar promoted the fostering of fiscal responsibility, defending the first and second amendments of the United States Constitution, and supporting small businesses and capitalism.

Personal life
Agar has a wife and three children. He resides in Thermopolis.

Electoral history

Notes

References

External links
Official page at the Wyoming Legislature
Profile from Ballotpedia
Official account on Facebook

1981 births
Living people
21st-century American politicians
Republican Party Wyoming state senators
Ranchers from Wyoming
People from Thermopolis, Wyoming
People from Weiser, Idaho